March 19 - Eastern Orthodox liturgical calendar - March 21

All fixed commemorations below are observed on April 2 by Orthodox Churches on the Old Calendar.

For March 20th, Orthodox Churches on the Old Calendar commemorate the Saints listed on March 7.

Saints

 Righteous Abel, first martyr in the history of mankind.
 Martyrs Photina (Fatima, Svetlana), the Samaritan woman, martyred under Nero (c. 66), together with:
 her sisters Phota, Photis, Parasceva, and Cyriaca (Kyriake); 
 her sons Victor (or Photinus) and Joses (Joseph); 
 Sebastian the Duke;
 the officer Anatolius; and 
 Theoclitus, the former sorcerer.
 Seven Virgin-martyrs of Amisus (Samsun) (c. 303-305):
 Alexandra, Claudia, Euphrasia, Matrona, Juliana, Euphemia, and Theodosia. 
 Martyr Akyla the Eparch, by the sword.
 Martyr Emmanuel, by the sword.
 Martyr Rodian, by the sword.
 Martyr Lollian the Elder.
 Hieromartyr Tadros, Bishop of Edessa, at Jerusalem (691)
 Martyr Michael the Sabbaite, at Jerusalem (691)
 Martyr Archil II (Archilios II), king of Georgia (744) (see also: June 21Bishop Nikolai Velimirovic. The Holy Martyr Archil II, King of Georgia (June 21). The Prologue from Ochrid. Lazarica Press - Birmingham 1985.)
 The Venerable Fathers martyred at the Monastery of St. Sabbas (796):
 Saints John, Sergius, Patrick, and others
 Saint Nicetas the Confessor, Bishop of Apollonias in Bithynia (813)

Pre-Schism Western saints

 Saint Urbitius, Bishop of Metz in the east of France (c. 420)
 Saint Tetricus of Langres, Bishop of Langres and uncle of St Gregory of Tours (572)
 Saint Martin of Braga in Iberia (580)
 Venerable Cuthbert of Lindisfarne, Bishop (687)
 Saint Herbert of Derwentwater, an Anglo-Saxon priest and friend of St Cuthbert, who lived as a hermit on St Herbert's Island (687)
 Saint Wulfram of Sens, missionary, Bishop of Sens (703)
 Saint Benignus, a monk and Abbot of Fontenelle Abbey (725)
 Saint Remigius von Straßburg, a noble, became Abbot of Münster near Colmar in France and in 776 Bishop of Strasbourg (783)
 Saint William of Peñacorada, monk at the monastery of Satagún in León in Spain (c. 1042)

Post-Schism Orthodox saints

 New Hieromartyr Euphrosynus of Blue-Jay Lake, Valaam, Novgorod Republic (1612)
 New Martyr Myron of Mega Castro (Heraklion) in Crete (1793)

New martyrs and confessors

 New Hieromartyr Basil Sokolov, Deacon (1938)
 New Hieromartyr Nicholas Holz, priest of Novosiolki, Chełm and Podlasie, Poland (1944)

Icon gallery

Notes

References

Sources
 March 20/April 2. Orthodox Calendar (PRAVOSLAVIE.RU).
 April 2 / March 20. HOLY TRINITY RUSSIAN ORTHODOX CHURCH (A parish of the Patriarchate of Moscow).
 March 20. OCA - The Lives of the Saints.
 The Autonomous Orthodox Metropolia of Western Europe and the Americas (ROCOR). St. Hilarion Calendar of Saints for the year of our Lord 2004. St. Hilarion Press (Austin, TX). p. 23.
 March 20. Latin Saints of the Orthodox Patriarchate of Rome.
 The Roman Martyrology. Transl. by the Archbishop of Baltimore. Last Edition, According to the Copy Printed at Rome in 1914. Revised Edition, with the Imprimatur of His Eminence Cardinal Gibbons. Baltimore: John Murphy Company, 1916. pp. 81–82.
 Rev. Richard Stanton. A Menology of England and Wales, or, Brief Memorials of the Ancient British and English Saints Arranged According to the Calendar, Together with the Martyrs of the 16th and 17th Centuries. London: Burns & Oates, 1892. pp. 125–128.
Greek Sources
 Great Synaxaristes:  20 ΜΑΡΤΙΟΥ. ΜΕΓΑΣ ΣΥΝΑΞΑΡΙΣΤΗΣ.
  Συναξαριστής. 20 Μαρτίου. ECCLESIA.GR. (H ΕΚΚΛΗΣΙΑ ΤΗΣ ΕΛΛΑΔΟΣ).
Russian Sources
  2 апреля (20 марта). Православная Энциклопедия под редакцией Патриарха Московского и всея Руси Кирилла (электронная версия). (Orthodox Encyclopedia - Pravenc.ru).
  20 марта (ст.ст.) 2 апреля 2013 (нов. ст.). Русская Православная Церковь Отдел внешних церковных связей. (DECR).

March in the Eastern Orthodox calendar